Nematocentropus is a genus of moths in the family Neopseustidae.

Species
Nematocentropus omeiensis Hwang, 1965
Nematocentropus schmidi (Mutuura, 1971)

External links
Systematics and Zoogeography of the Family Neopseustidae with the Proposal of a New Superfamily (Lepidoptera: Neopseustoidea)

Neopseustidae
Moth genera
Glossata genera